Asbforushan (also Romanized as Asbforūshān) is a village in Howmeh Rural District of the Central District of Sarab County, East Azerbaijan province, Iran. At the 2006 National Census, its population was 3,075 in 832 households. The following census in 2011 counted 2,974 people in 883 households. The latest census in 2016 showed a population of 2,898 people in 976 households; it was the largest village in its rural district.

References 

Sarab County

Populated places in East Azerbaijan Province

Populated places in Sarab County